was a town located in Sōsa District, Chiba Prefecture, Japan.

In 2003, the town had an estimated population of 12,055 and a density of 361.90 persons per square kilometer (937.32 persons per square mile).

On March 27, 2006, Hikari, along with the town of Yokoshiba (from Sanbu District), was merged to create the town of Yokoshibahikari. The new town is in Sanbu District; Sōsa District was dissolved as a result of this merger.

External links
 Yokoshibahikari official website 

Dissolved municipalities of Chiba Prefecture
Yokoshibahikari